Pinky is the nickname of:

 Pinky Agnew (born 1955), New Zealand actress, author and social commentator
 Pinky Beecroft, Australian singer, songwriter and screenwriter
 Benazir Bhutto (1953–2007), twice Prime Minister of Pakistan
 Sheila Levrant de Bretteville (born 1940), American graphic designer, artist and educator 
 Withers A. Burress (1894–1977), US Army lieutenant general
 Cuthbert Burnup (1875–1960), English amateur cricketer and footballer
 Savika Chaiyadej (born 1986), Thai actress
 Keith Christensen (born 1947), American retired football player
 Louis Clarke (1901–77), American sprinter and Olympic relay champion
 Sally Maria Diggs (c. 1851–?), American slave girl bought and freed by Henry Ward Beecher
 Pinky Hargrave (1896–1942), American Major League Baseball player
 J. C. Harrington (1901–1998), American archaeologist
 Pinky Higgins (1909–1969), American Major League Baseball player, manager, executive and scout
 Noella Leduc (born 1933), pitcher and outfielder in the All-American Girls Professional Baseball League (1951–1954)
 Chris Lindsay (1878–1941), American Major League Baseball player
 Mary Pinkney Hardy MacArthur, wife of Arthur MacArthur Jr. and mother of Douglas MacArthur
 Pinky May (1911–2000), American Major League Baseball player
 Pinky Mitchell (1899–1976), American boxer and National Boxing Association light welterweight champion
 George Nelson (astronaut) (born 1950), American astronomer and retired NASA astronaut
 Neil Patterson (athlete) (1885–1948), American high jumper
 Jan Peerce (1904–1984), American operatic tenor
 Pauline Pirok (born 1926), member of the All-American Girls Professional Baseball League (1943–1948)
 Pinky Pittenger (1899–1977), American Major League Baseball player
 Donn F. Porter (1931–1952), US Army sergeant posthumously awarded the Medal of Honor
 Lidia Elsa Satragno (1935-2022), Argentine actress and news anchor
 Pinky Silverberg (1904–1964), American boxer, briefly National Boxing Association flyweight champion
 Virginia Pinky Smith, American pioneering female jockey
 Meredith P. Snyder (1858–1937), American businessman and three-time mayor of Los Angeles
 Pinky Swander (1880–1944), American Major League Baseball player
 Myron "Pinky" Thompson (1924–2001), social worker and community leader in Hawaiʻi 
 Pinky Tomlin (1907–1987), singer, songwriter and bandleader of the 1930s and 1940s
 Pinky Webb (born 1970), Filipino television news anchor
 Pinky Whitney (1905–1987), American Major League Baseball player
 Pinky Woods (1920–1982), American Major League Baseball pitcher

See also
 Pinkie (disambiguation)

Lists of people by nickname